Yonghe Town is a rural town in Liuyang City, Hunan Province, People's Republic of China. It is surrounded by the towns of Guandu and Zhangfang on the north, Yanxi Town on the northwest, Gugang Town on the west, Xiaohe Township on the east, and the towns of Gaoping and Zhonghe on the south. Qibaoshan Township was merged to Yonghe town on November 18, 2015.

Administrative division
The town is divided into 10 villages and one community, the following areas:
 Juxiang Community
 Jiacheng Village
 Shijia Village
 Jinpen Village
 Jingquan Village
 Tieshan Village
 Shizishan Village
 Shengping Village
 Zengjiatai Village
 Qibaoshan Village

Geography
The Daxi River, flows northeast to southwest through the town.

The Zhushuqiao Reservoir is the largest body of water in the town. The reservoir provides drinking water and water for irrigation.

Economy
Yonghe Town's economy is based on nearby mineral resources, such as chrysanthemum stone, meerschaum, copper, iron, and phosphorus.

Education
Nowadays, Yonghe Town has two public middle school: Yonghe Middle School, as well as Qibaoshan Middle School.

Transportation

County Road
The County Road X003 runs through the town.

Expressway
The Changsha–Liuyang Expressway, from Changsha, running through the towns of Dongyang, Jiaoxi, Gugang, Sankou, Guandu, Zhangfang to Jiangxi.

Railway
The Liling–Liuyang railway's terminus is located in the town. It was removed in 2004.

Attractions
The main attractions are the Grand House of Li Family and White Horse Isle Wetland.

Notable people
 Li Zhen (female general), the first female general of the People's Liberation Army.
 Tang Liang, a general in the People's Liberation Army.
 Zhang Qilong, politician.

References

Divisions of Liuyang
Liuyang